Sergei Viktorovich Kovalyov (born 13 August 1972 in Voronezh) is a Russian football manager and a former player.

References

1972 births
Footballers from Voronezh
Living people
Soviet footballers
FC Dynamo Moscow reserves players
Russian footballers
FC Tyumen players
Russian Premier League players
FC Spartak-UGP Anapa players
Association football defenders
FC Fakel Voronezh players